RodMaker Magazine was founded in 1997 by Tom Kirkman. It was a continuation of his involvement in the custom rod building industry. The magazine's mandate is to further the craft of custom fishing rod building by continually introducing new ideas, techniques and methods.

Since its inception, RodMaker Magazine has been published 6 times per year. Although the magazine initially was available on some news stands, today it is only delivered by mail to America, Australia, Canada and Europe. The magazine is based in High Point, North Carolina.

Exposition
In 2002, RodMaker Magazine began subsidizing and hosting the International Custom Rod Building Exposition which features most of the major rod blank and component supply manufacturers and dealers. The event now serves as the world's largest event for custom rod building and is the custom rod building industry's primary trade show event.  It is held annually in Winston-Salem NC in late February. It is open to the public.

References

External links
 RodMaker Magazine (official website)
 Interview with Independent Magazine Publisher Tom Kirkman of Rodmaker Magazine
 Rod Exposition (official website)

Bimonthly magazines published in the United States
Hunting and fishing magazines
Magazines established in 1997
Magazines published in North Carolina